The Last Sentence (Italian: L' ultima sentenza) is a 1951 Italian melodrama-crime film co-written and directed  by Mario Bonnard and starring Charles Vanel, Antonella Lualdi and Eleonora Rossi Drago.

Cast
 Charles Vanel as Marco Valsetti
 Antonella Lualdi as Daniela Valsetti
 Eleonora Rossi Drago as Marisa
 Jacques Sernas as Piero
 Erno Crisa as Roberto
 Harry Feist  as Baron Polsok
 Dina Sassoli as Marta Onori
 Paolo Panelli as Michele
 Emma Baron as Piero's Mother
 Bianca Doria as Miss Farra
 Nino Pavese as Dr. Bini
 Mariliana Delli as Berta
 Yvonne Snyder as Elena Brian
 Armando Migliari  as Giuseppe Andreani
 Walter Santesso as Student
  Luisa Della Noce  (credited as Malù Della Noce)

References

External links
 

1951 films
1950s Italian-language films
Italian crime drama films
1951 crime drama films
Italian black-and-white films
1950s Italian films